Channel Nepal was the first Nepali satellite television channel. Jamim Shah, a media entrepreneur, owned the channel until his 2010 murder. This channel provides entertainment, information and current affairs.

The station was banned temporarily in 2000 after wrongly attributing anti-Nepal comments to Bollywood star Hrithik Roshan, sparking riots which left four people dead and 180 people injured in Nepal.

References

External links

Television channels in Nepal